Joshua Mqabuko Nkomo International Airport  is an airport located  outside Bulawayo, Zimbabwe.

Overview 
Originally known as Bulawayo International Airport, it was renamed in honour of the late Dr Joshua Nkomo, the leader and founder of the Zimbabwe African People's Union in 2001. Dr Nkomo also served as a Vice President of the Zimbabwe Government. It is another of Zimbabwe's international airports.  Robert Gabriel Mugabe International Airport near the capital sees similar flight traffic.

The airport operates 16 hours a day, with immigration and customs services available during operating hours. The offered airport facilities include aircraft parking, cargo and passenger handling. Additional facilities include dining, shopping, accommodation, banking, car parking, car rentals and shuttle services. The new terminal of Joshua Nkomo International Airport was opened on 1 November 2013.

Airlines and destinations

Accidents and Incidents 
 29 Jan 2019 - A Fastjet plane failed to land because of power failure at the airport

References

External links
 Official website
Departure and Arrival Times

Buildings and structures in Bulawayo
Airports in Zimbabwe